Andrew Neville Campbell KC (born 17 June 1949) is a former English cricketer who is currently a barrister.  Campbell was a left-handed batsman.  He was born in Chesham Bois, Buckinghamshire.  He studied at New College, Oxford, emerging with an honours degree in jurisprudence.

Campbell made his first-class debut for Oxford University against Sussex in 1968.  He played a further 14 first-class matches, the last coming against Cambridge University in 1970.  He scored 530 runs in these matches, at a batting average of 20.38, with 4 half centuries and a high score of 73.  This came against Surrey in 1970.

Campbell played Minor counties cricket for Buckinghamshire, who he debuted for in the 1970 Minor Counties Championship against Bedfordshire.  He played Minor counties cricket for Buckinghamshire from 1970 to 1972, making 14 appearances.  Following the end of his cricket career, Campbell became a barrister.  He was called to the bar in 1972, and appointed as a Queen's Counsel in 1994.  He is currently practising on the North Eastern Circuit, and is a recorder at Zenith Chambers in Leeds, Yorkshire.

References

External links
Andrew Campbell at ESPNcricinfo
Andrew Campbell at CricketArchive

1949 births
Living people
People from Chiltern District
Alumni of New College, Oxford
English cricketers
Oxford University cricketers
Buckinghamshire cricketers
English barristers
Members of the Middle Temple
20th-century King's Counsel
21st-century King's Counsel